Dear Albania is a 2015 travel documentary film about Albania produced by Eliza Dushku and directed by Nate Dushku who are of Albanian descent. Dushku’s father is an Albanian-American and her mother is of Danish and English descent. In Dear Albania, Eliza and her brother Nate travel to the Balkan region where they explore 15 cities throughout Albania, Kosovo, Montenegro and Macedonia.

See also
Tourism in Albania

External links

References

2015 films
2015 documentary films
Albanian-language films
Documentary films about Albania
Films directed by Nate Dushku
Films shot in Albania
Films shot in Kosovo
Films shot in Montenegro
Films shot in North Macedonia
2010s English-language films